Hannu Veli Soikkanen (born 4 August 1930 in Sippola) is a Finnish historian, PhD 1965. Soikkanen was active in the study of Finland's history 1962–66 at the University of Turku, and 1967–76 in economic and social history. Between 1976 and 1993 he was a professor in social history at Helsinki University.

Soikkanen has studied the working class movement and the social democratic partys history, and also the communal self-governments history in Finland. Amongst his works are Sosialismin tulo Suomeen (1961), which is about the coming of socialism to Finland, Kunnallinen itsehallinto kansanvallan perusteena (1966), about the communes, Kansalaissota dokumentteina (1967–69), a selection of sources to the Finnish civil war 1918, Luovutetun Karjalan työväenliikkeen historia (1970), about the Karelian working class movement and Kohti kansanvaltaa 1-3 (1975–91), which treats the social democratic party's history up to 1952. He has also published local historical works such as Varkauden historia (1963) and Sulkavan historia II (2002, with Paavo Seppänen).

References 
 Uppslagsverket Finland, 4 (2006)

1930 births
Living people
People from Kouvola
20th-century Finnish historians
Academic staff of the University of Helsinki